The 2010 Royal Bank of Scotland Challenger was a professional tennis tournament played on hard courts. It was the fourth edition of the tournament which is part of the 2010 ATP Challenger Tour. It took place in Tiburon, California, United States between 12 and 17 October 2010.

Singles main-draw entrants

Seeds

 Rankings are as of October 4, 2010.

Other entrants
The following players received wildcards into the singles main draw:
  Bradley Klahn
  Daniel Kosakowski
  Raymond Sarmiento
  Blake Strode

The following players received entry as a special entrant into the singles main draw:
  Giovanni Lapentti

The following players received entry as an alternate into the singles main draw:
  Ryler DeHeart

The following players received entry from the qualifying draw:
  Jamie Baker
  Pierre-Ludovic Duclos
  Kiryl Harbatsiuk
  Frederik Nielsen

The following players received entry as a Lucky loser into the singles main draw:
  Jesse Witten

Champions

Singles

 Tobias Kamke def.  Ryan Harrison, 6–1, 6–1

Doubles

 Robert Kendrick /  Travis Rettenmaier def.  Ryler DeHeart /  Pierre-Ludovic Duclos, 6–1, 6–4

External links
Official website
ITF Search 
ATP official site

Royal Bank of Scotland Challenger
Tiburon Challenger
2010 in American tennis
2010 in sports in California